The Under Secretary of State for Management is a position within the United States Department of State that serves as principal adviser to the Secretary of State and Deputy Secretary of State on matters relating to the allocation and use of Department of State budget, physical property, and personnel, including planning, the day-to-day administration of the Department, and proposals for institutional reform and modernization.

The Under Secretary is appointed by the President of the United States with the consent of the United States Senate to serve at the request of the President.

In 2021, President Joe Biden nominated John R. Bass, a career foreign service officer and former ambassador, to the position.

Overview
The Under Secretary of State for Management is the State Department's representative on the President's Management Council, and is the Department official responsible for implementing the President's Management Agenda.

History
In an Act of February 7, 1953, Congress created for a 2-year period the position of Under Secretary of State for Administration as the third ranking officer in the Department. The position was not renewed, however; and between 1955 and 1978, the ranking officer in the Department handling administration and management questions was either a Deputy Under Secretary or an Assistant Secretary of State. On October 7, 1978, an Act of Congress created the permanent position of Under Secretary of State for Management.

Reporting officials
Officials reporting to the USS(M) include:

Officeholders
The table below includes both the various titles of this post over time, as well as all the holders of those offices.

References

 
1953 introductions